The African dwarf skate (Neoraja stehmanni), or South African pygmy skate, is a species of fish in the family Rajidae. It is endemic to South Africa. Its natural habitat is open seas.

Sources
.

African dwarf skate
Marine fish of South Africa
Endemic fish of South Africa
Taxa named by P. Alexander Hulley
African dwarf skate
Taxonomy articles created by Polbot